Abdi İpekçi Arena, formerly known as Abdi İpekçi Sports Complex, was a multi-purpose indoor arena located in the Zeytinburnu district of Istanbul, Turkey, situated just outside the ancient city walls, in Yedikule.

History 
Designed in 1979, and opened on 3 June 1989, after several years of interrupted construction, it was named after the renowned Turkish journalist Abdi İpekçi. It was the primary basketball venue in Istanbul for two decades and hosted many (mostly the international) games of Istanbul's four top basketball clubs Anandolu Efes, Fenerbahçe, Galatasaray and Besiktas, as well as many other sports events and concerts. However, its significance declined after the opening of Sinan Erdem Dome in 2010, which surpassed Abdi İpekçi Arena as the biggest and most state of the art arena in Istanbul.

Closure 
After the 2016/2017 season, the arena was closed. It got demolished in early 2018. In its place, a basketball training and performance center is to be built. Basketball teams Anadolu Efes and Galatasaray are now playing their games at Sinan Erdem Dome beginning with the 2017/18 season. Galatasaray also plans to move into a newly built own arena in the coming years. Fenerbahçe already moved into their own Ülker Sports Arena in 2012.

Facilities
The arena had an audience seating capacity of 12,270. It hosted national and international sports events, such as basketball, volleyball, wrestling, and weightlifting, as well as concerts and congresses, among other events. The facility contained a multi-faced visual scoreboard, six online-system counters, four locker rooms, two internet rooms, a press room, two multi-purpose offices, VIP rooms, etc. Its parking lot had a capacity of 1,500 cars.

Events
The professional basketball teams of Galatasaray men's basketball team and Galatasaray women's basketball team played their Turkish League home matches since the 2009–10 season in the Abdi İpekçi Arena.

Some of the notable events, which took place in the arena are:

 1992 FIBA European League Final Four 
 1995 FIBA European Cup Final
 1996 FIBA EuroStars
 1997 Girl Power! Live in Istanbul
 2001 Depeche Mode concert Exciter Tour
 EuroBasket 2001 Final phase
 2004 Eurovision Song Contest
 2005 Phil Collins Concert
 2007 Enrique Iglesias Concert
 2009 European Short Course Swimming Championships
 2009 Men's European Volleyball Championship
 2010 FIBA World Championship
 2011 European Judo Championships
 2012 EuroLeague Women Final Eight
 2014 FIBA World Championship for Women

References

External links

Arena page on TBF website 

1986 establishments in Turkey
Basketball venues in Turkey
Galatasaray Basketball
Galatasaray S.K. facilities
Indoor arenas in Turkey
Music venues in Istanbul
Sports venues completed in 1986
Sports venues in Istanbul
Swimming venues in Turkey
Turkish Basketball League venues
Volleyball venues in Turkey
Zeytinburnu
Abdi İpekçi
Defunct indoor arenas
Defunct basketball venues
Defunct volleyball venues
Sports venues demolished in 2018
Defunct sports venues in Turkey
Demolished buildings and structures in Istanbul